All Roads Are Made of the Flesh is a live album by Kip Hanrahan released in March 1995, featuring guests including Jack Bruce, Don Pullen, and Andy Gonzalez. It features tracks recorded live in Nijmegen, Copenhagen, Baden-Baden and New York. "Buddy Boldens Blues" was written by Jelly Roll Morton.

Critical reception 
The Lake Geneva Regional News described the first track, "Buddy Bolden's Blues", as "a step into next year".

Writing for the Detroit Free Press, music reviewer Fernando Gonzalez wrote that All Roads Are Made of the Flesh "offers improbable combinations like Jack Bruce rubbing elbows with Charles Neville, Elisee Pyroneau and Giovanni Hidalgo in the song "...at the same time." Musically, All Roads stretches from the intimate version of Jelly Rolly Morton's "Buddy Bolden's Blues" sung by Bruce to the intense R&B-meets-free-jazz-meets-salsa and Cuban "conjunto" of "...at the same time"."

Track listing

Personnel 

Don Pullen – organ, piano
Allen Toussaint – piano
Charles Neville – tenor saxophone
Jack Bruce – vocals, bass
Anthony Carillo – congas
Milton Cardona – congas
Richie Flores – congas 
J.T. Lewis – drums (trap drums) 
Robbie Ameen – drums (trap drums)
Leo Nocentelli – guitar
Chico Freeman – tenor saxophone
Chocolate Armenteros – trumpet
Alfredo Triff – violin
Wolfgang Puschnig – alto saxophone
Dino Saluzzi – bandoneon
Renaud Garcia-Fons – bass
Michael Riessler – bass clarinet
Carmen Lundy – vocals
Andy Gonzalez – bass
Giovanni Hidalgo – congas
Jerry Gonzalez – congas
Willie Green – drums (trap drums)
Elysee Pyronneau – guitar
Charles Neville – tenor saxophone
Steve Swallow – bass
Ignacio Berroa – drums (trap drums)
George Adams – tenor saxophone
Lars Palfig – recording
Max Federhofer – recording

References

1995 albums
Kip Hanrahan albums